Vieuxville is a district of the municipality of Ferrières, located in the province of Liège in Wallonia, Belgium.

The settlement of Vieuxville grew up around the fortified castle , strategically located at the confluence of the Ourthe and  rivers. It formed part of the western defense of the Princely Abbey of Stavelot-Malmedy and was destroyed in 1521 during the war between Emperor Charles V and Francis I of France. The village of Vieuxville also contains some other historical buildings and a village church from 1881. There is also a well-preserved Romanesque chapel by the cemetery.

References

External links

Populated places in Liège Province